Taradeau is a commune in the Var department in the Provence-Alpes-Côte d'Azur region in southeastern France.

Shops

Taradeau has many small but convenient shops and bars. There is a "tabac", groceries, bar/restaurant and baker's. The village has a yearly circus which appears around August time. The old supermarket "Super U" has been demolished and "Hyper U" has been constructed. It is a small village and the main language is French.

La Tour de Taradel

Taradeau contains a historical building that is interesting to visit. During the 12th Century AD, the French built a watch tower named "La Tour de Taradel". It is still present today.
Every year Taradeau has a fireworks display on the local football field, celebrating the French Liberation, when the Germans lost their power over France.

The main religion there is Roman Catholic.

See also
Communes of the Var department

References

External links

Provenceweb - Taradeau

Communes of Var (department)
Var communes articles needing translation from French Wikipedia